Guayadeque is the name of:

Barranco de Guayadeque, Gully and National Monument on Gran Canaria
Guayadeque Music Player